Hsiao-Wen Ting (born October 2, 1963) is a singer-songwriter, producer, A&R executive, executive manager, and TV host. Currently, she plays an active role in the Chinese music industry, having entered the industry in 1985.

Early life 
Ting's passion for music started at an early age, when she would watch Taiwanese singing variety show Qun Xing Hui (群星會) with her family, and sing along while listening to vinyl records with her brother. As a student, Ting wrote poetry for which she often received positive feedback from her teachers. Ting has said that one reason she entered the music industry as a lyricist is due to the writing training she received in her student life, and the inspiration she got from the rise of the folk era in Taiwan.

In the 1980s, Ting enrolled in the Department of Mass Communication at Fu Jen Catholic University, studying advertisements, films, TV broadcast, and photography. She participated in various annual songwriting and performance contests, including "Cyan Rhyme" (輔大青韻獎) and "Da Xue Cheng", achieving first and second places. She received a second place in songwriting with "If I Can" (如果能夠). These recognitions and performances all became the stepping stone of Ting's opportunity of participating in the joint record and led Ting to her debut as a singer.

Career

Early career 
After the joint album, Ting was signed as a singer in UFO Records Company by Chu Chu Wu, and released the album After Campus with Kevin Lin. When recording her own album, Ting grew interested in the production of records, and decided to emerge into the production side of the business. She left UFO and joined Rock Records, producing music with Jonathan Lee.

As a producing assistant, Ting accumulated experience with big figures in music production, including "Kiss of Silk" (紗的吻) by Michelle Pan (co-produced by Guang Yuan Shen), A Woman's Heart (女人心) by Sarah Chen in 1988 (co-produced by Jonathan Lee), and "I Am Addicted to You" (上了你癮) by Hsiao Shih Tang. Her first time being the producer herself was in 1988 with Flaming Red Lips (烈焰紅唇) by Anita Mui.

Songwriter and producer 
Ting's production and songwriting career expanded to working with popular artists and collaborating with the music industry in Hong Kong and China. In the 1990s when the Taiwanese music industry was booming, Ting wrote the lyrics for "You Are the Eternal Pain in My Heart" by Dave Wong, the theme song for Wong Kar-wai’s movie As Tears Go By (旺角卡門). The song was a great success and brought Ting to fame. She later published numerous hit song lyrics such as "Green Apple Paradise" (青蘋果樂園) by Xiao Hu Dui (The Little Tigers), "Home Again Without You" (愛上一個不回家的人) by Sandy Lam, "Blessing" (祝福) by Jacky Cheung, "Love is Deeper" (愛得比較深) by Sarah Chen, "Years of Youth" (青春夢) by Alan Tam, and "My Love My Dream My Home" (我的愛我的夢我的家) by Fong Fei-fei.

Ting has produced and supervised best-selling albums including Conquer (征服) by Na Ying, In One's Own Room (在自己的房間裡) by Gloria Yip, Infatuated Me (癡心的我) by Samuel Tai, and Worth It (值得) by Sammi Cheng.

Stage performance 
Ting has performed in numerous concert venues in Taiwan, including Taipei Arena, Kaohsiung Arena, Legacy Taipei and Taichung, Taipei International Convention Centre, Sun Yat-sen Memorial Hall, Riverside Live House (Ximen and Gongguan), and Songshan Cultural and Creative Park. She has also performed in Chinese venues Oriental Wende Plaza in Guangzhou and Wuzhou Auditorium One in Beijing. Ting organized a solo concert There's a Song in Everyone's Heart (每個人心中都有一首歌) in 2014, 30 years after her debut. Till this day, the concert recordings are still being replayed by Taiwan Public Television Service.

Talent development 
Ting has worked in music education and developing new talents. She is often invited by institutions and broadcast media as an instructor for classes or workshops, or as a panel judge member for contests. She has taught in universities in Taiwan including National Taiwan Normal University, Fu Jen Catholic University, Shih Hsin University, Chung Yuan Christian University, National Taipei University, Chinese Culture University, and Shih Chien University. She has held workshops and seminars at special events such as Golden Melody Festival (金曲國際音樂節) and Taoyuan Taiwan Iron Rose Music Festival (桃園鐵玫瑰音樂節).

Ting also provided support for the completion of the Ministry of Culture's project "Pop Music Teaching Materials for Primary and Middle Schools" (國小及國高中流行音樂輔助教材), and started classes on lyrics writing and singing at Xuexue. Ting is creditable with discovering and developing the talents of singers Jeff Chang and Fu Kai Hsu and lyricist Yan Yunnong.

Public affairs 
In 1996 Ting entered Warner Chappell Music as creative director to sign exclusive writers and to establish IP and the royalties scheme. Two years later, she gathered hundreds of musicians to sign a petition to revise the Copyright Act from the Copyright Review and Mediation Committee of Ministry of the Interior. In 1999, Ting supported the founding of MÜST, an institution to protect the rights of musicians, and served as the chairman. She was also involved in the founding of Taipei Music Center, and has been supporting the establishment of the database for Taiwanese pop music and the preservation of its history.

Other appearances 
Ting has served as the panel judge for many music competitions for more than 30 years. These include Golden Bell Awards, Golden Melody Awards, I Am a Singer (我是歌手) by Hunan Television, Super Star (明日之星) by Formosa Television (民視), Kan Jian Yin Yue (看見音樂計畫) by TikTok. Ting still serves as a panel judge for music shows on TV programs regularly.

Ting is often invited as the host for events and broadcast programs. She has hosted concerts including Taipei Broadcasting Station's annual event "Heading to 2018 – Full of Happiness Concert", Taipei Symphony Orchestra's "You're all that my memory is – seamless concert", and Fujen University's "Those Happy Fujen Times – 520 Folk Concert". She has also held seminar workshop events like Da-Yu Lo's "The Story of Music and Movies", Judy Ong's Print and Engraving Paint Gallery Seminar, and other musical events such as the songwriting contest "Da Xue Cheng" (大學城). She is also the host for the radio program "Hsiao-Wen Doesn't Sing Today" (曉雯老師不唱歌).

Ting has also written two books: Our Music Class – Creative Music Influence after 1980 in Taiwan (我們的音樂課----影響台灣80’s後的音樂原創力), published in 2012, and her autobiography There's a Song in Everyone's Heart (每個人心中都有一首歌), which shares the name of her 2014 solo concert. For charity, a thousand copies of Our Music Class – Creative Music Influence after 1980 in Taiwan were distributed for free to schools after its publication.

Artistry

Production mindset 
In her autobiography, Ting has talked about her attitude towards being a producer:    When producing Na Ying's album Conquering (征服), Ting had been demanding yet constructive when giving feedback. As the album was planned to be released in Taiwan, Ting repeatedly commented on Na Ying's pronunciation and requested for retakes. Na Ying got angry, saying "My pronunciation is more legit than yours!", receiving the reply from Ting: "That's exactly why I don't want you to sound so legit."  Other than this little incident in producing the album, Ting wanted Na Ying to emphasize on her mid-range singing, unlike her past performances that are focused on powerful voicings. She purposely incorporated songs that allow Na Ying to perform her mid-range voicing while also demonstrating her high-pitch advantages.

Ting has said that a producer should follow the singer's traits, position them, select the right songs to make sure the style, content, and the singer are in agreement. When producing Sandy Lam's album, Ting did some market research analysis, and deciding that Sandy should take on a first-person approach when singing. This finding later allowed Ting to write "Home Again Without You" (愛上一個不回家的人) as the hit song for the album.

Style 
Ting has said she hopes her lyrics resonate with the listeners and make them touched emotionally and spiritually, and that she is not fond of using embellished writing; instead, she prefers using straightforward and practical word choices to bring out the inner feelings of the listeners.

Works

Songwriting 
Ting has released over 400 songs, notably:

Recorded songs

Albums produced 
Ting has produced over 40 albums. Below are a few listed:

Concerts produced

Awards and recognition

References

Chinese male singer-songwriters
Living people
Place of birth missing (living people)
1963 births
Fu Jen Catholic University alumni